The 112th Independent Brigade of the Territorial Defense Forces is a military formation of the Territorial Defense Forces of Ukraine in Kyiv. It is part of Operational Command North.

History

Formation 
On 20 December 2017, a meeting between military commissariats of  Kyiv city, Kyiv Oblast and Operational Command North took place. Its purpose was to train staff regarding procedures for formation and organization of the brigade.

In Spring 2018 the brigade was formed in Kyiv. Lieutenant Colonel Bilosvit Mykola became its first commander. Brigade needed a core of regular soldiers and 4,000 reservists aged 40–55 year old. By November only 4.5% of needed contracts were signed with 30% needed by the end of the year. By the end of 2019 all 100% of positions needed to be filled. From 11 to 15 June a rifle company of the 127th Territorial Defense Battalion held training exercises for reservists in Desnianskyi District. During 14-15 December 2018 a training exercise for officers of headquarters and battalions was held, where they planned defending Kyiv. 6 larger districts of Kyiv had their own battalions, while the remaining 4 formed other units.

During 14-19 April 2019 another larger scale training exercise for officers of headquarters and battalions was held, where they planned defending Kyiv. This exercise included more reserve officers.

On 13 March 2021 Kyiv Mayor Vitali Klitschko with his deputies took part in a training exercise at the Desna training center.

On 18 May 2021 only 300 reservists had signed contracts with the Brigade. Over 3,000 were needed to fully staff brigade. By October that number increased to 350 contract soldiers and close to 4,000 overall. On 21 December another exercise took place and a number of 5,000 soldiers was announced. With a battalion being formed in every district.

On 7 February 2022 Brigade already had 9 battalions and held large exercise with all of them.

Russo-Ukrainian War

2022 Russian invasion of Ukraine
During first day of invasion, Brigade was fully filled with reservist, who manned hundreds of roadblocks. On 27 February brigade had filled all available vacancies in all it's battalions. Since there was abundance of volunteers, a decision was made to raise a new brigade in Kyiv. Battalions 130, 204, 205, 206, 207 were transferred to 241st Kyiv City Defense Brigade.

Brigade was active in Battle of Kyiv, Battle of Hostomel, Battle of Brovary, Battle of Moshchun, Battle of Bucha, Battle of Irpin, Capture of Chernobyl, 2022 Kharkiv counteroffensive, 2022 Kherson counteroffensive and Battle of Bakhmut.

206th Territorial Defense Battalion was raised for defense of Kyiv and was equipped and financed by former president Petro Poroshenko. Deputies and supporters of European Solidarity party joined the battalion. During first week of fighting battalion took part in defense of Obolonskyi District during Battle of Kyiv. In following days fought in Battle of Hostomel and evacuated women and children during Battle of Irpin.

207th Territorial Defense Battalion began forming in January and was formed on 27 February 2022. It was commanded by Yushko Viktor.

On 2 April a special security company was raised for protection of critical infrastructure. During a military oath ceremony, Vitali Klitschko noted that 7 members of Kyiv City Council joined the company.

128th Territorial Defense Battalion was deployed to Chuhuiv in May and remained there as of early August.

244th Territorial Defense Battalion has been active since at least middle of July.

On 29 August the brigade received its battle flag.

Structure 

In May 2021 the brigade's structure was:
 Headquarters
 126th Territorial Defense Battalion (Darnytskyi District)  А7292
  127th Territorial Defense Battalion (Desnianskyi District)  А7293
  128th Territorial Defense Battalion (Dniprovskyi District)  А7294
  129th Territorial Defense Battalion (Obolonskyi District)  А7295
  130th Territorial Defense Battalion (Solomianskyi District)  А7296
  131st Territorial Defense Battalion (Sviatoshynskyi District)  А7297
 Counter-Sabotage Company
 Engineering Company
 Communication Company
 Logistics Company
 Mortar Battery

In Early 2022 the brigade's structure was:
 Headquarters
 126th Territorial Defense Battalion (Darnytskyi District)  А7292
  127th Territorial Defense Battalion (Desnianskyi District)  А7293
  128th Territorial Defense Battalion (Dniprovskyi District)  А7294
  129th Territorial Defense Battalion (Obolonskyi District)  А7295
  130th Territorial Defense Battalion (Solomianskyi District)  А7296
  131st Territorial Defense Battalion (Sviatoshynskyi District)  А7297
  204th Territorial Defense Battalion (Holosiivskyi District)  А7373
  205th Territorial Defense Battalion (Pecherskyi District)  А7374
  206th Territorial Defense Battalion (Podilskyi District)  А7375
 207th Territorial Defense Battalion (Shevchenkivskyi District)  А7376
 Counter-Sabotage Company
 Engineering Company
 Communication Company
 Logistics Company
 Mortar Battery

As of April 2022 the brigade's structure is as follows:
 Headquarters
 126th Territorial Defense Battalion (Darnytskyi District)  А7292
  127th Territorial Defense Battalion (Desnianskyi District)  А7293
  128th Territorial Defense Battalion (Dniprovskyi District)  А7294
  129th Territorial Defense Battalion (Obolonskyi District)  А7295
  131st Territorial Defense Battalion (Sviatoshynskyi District)  А7297
244th Territorial Defense Battalion (Obolonskyi District)
 Counter-Sabotage Company
 Engineering Company
 Communication Company
 Logistics Company
 Mortar Battery

Commanders 
 Lieutenant Colonel Bilosvit Mykola 2018- 2021
 Major Husachenko Serhii December 2021 (acting)
 Colonel Pavlii Oleksandr 2022 - present

Insignia 
Emblem shows a stylized bow with an arrow placed inside of golden circle, which was a part of Kyiv Regiment flag during the Cossack Hetmanate.

See also 
 Territorial Defense Forces of the Armed Forces of Ukraine

References 

Territorial defense Brigades of Ukraine
2018 establishments in Ukraine
Military units and formations established in 2018